The Island of Eternal Love is a 2006 novel by Cuban author Daína Chaviano.

The plot is a family saga that takes place along two parallel lines: one during our time and another that begins in the 1850s.

The modern story revolves around the paranormal investigations of Cecilia, a young journalist researching a phantom house that appears and disappears in different parts of Miami. Several witnesses claim to have seen the inhabitants of that house, whose behavior seems to hide a secret that she decides to find out.

Before starting her investigations into the house, Cecilia goes to a bar, where she meets an old woman whom she befriends. Night after night, Cecilia listens to the story of that woman, who returns to that spot each evening to await a mysterious visitor. And this account is the other part of the novel, which begins in the nineteenth century in three regions of the world: Africa (Kingdom of Ifé, currently Nigeria), China (Canton) and Spain (Cuenca).

Different magical or supernatural events conspire to make the three stories from the past begin to mix: an ancient god’s promise changes the future of a young woman in the mountains of Cuenca (Spain); a ritual in which the presence of a sensual deity is invoked is secretly witnessed by a young girl, who falls under the demonic spell of the goddess; a spirit that can only be seen by the women in a family triggers events that decide the fate of all; the sudden appearance of a ghost causes a widow’s ruin... All of these events culminate in the story of a love that must face the opposition of two families.
 
Part history, part romance, part gothic, part esoteric, the novel also pays homage to the bolero. Historical personages from the world of music mix with fictional characters and are part of the plot: the pianist Joaquín Nin (father of Anaïs Nin), Ernesto Lecuona, Rita Montaner, Beny Moré, La Lupe, singer Fredesvinda García and others are historical figures caught up in the story.
 
The novel was first published in Spain by Grijalbo (Random House Group) in 2006 as La isla de los amores infinitos.

The Island of Eternal Love, whose rights have been sold to 26 languages, has become the most translated Cuban novel of all time.

Its English edition was released by Riverhead Books-Penguin Group (translated by Andrea L. Labinger) in June 2008.

References

External links 
Daína Chaviano's Official Web. In English and Spanish.
The Island of Eternal Love Official Book Trailer
Official Book Page
All editions of the novel.
Laura Dail Literary Agency.
Library Journal Review, June 1, 2008.
Gary K. Wolfe, "A Rich, Moving, Musical Novel" (review of The Island of Eternal Love), Locus Magazine, June 2008.
Yvette Fuentes, Ph.D., "A Fascinating Fusion of History and Fantasy" (an academic review], Anthurium: A Caribbean Journal Studies, Vol. 6, Issue 2, Fall 2008. .

2008 American novels
Cuban magic realism novels
Cuban-American literature
Family saga novels
Fiction set in the 1850s
Hispanic and Latino American novels
Literature by Hispanic and Latino American women
Novels by Daína Chaviano
Novels set in China
Novels set in Miami
Novels set in Nigeria
Novels set in Spain
Novels set in the Caribbean
Novels set on islands